Daniel John Szymborski (born June 19, 1978, in Baltimore, Maryland) is an American writer of sabermetrics primarily known for his work with baseball projections and minor league translations. 

Szymborski is a member of Society for American Baseball Research (SABR). He originally became known for contributions to BaseballPrimer.com, now known as Baseball Think Factory, after the site was featured by Time in 2002 and 2003's Moneyball by Michael Lewis.  After developing his projection system, ZiPS (SZymborski Projection System) prior to the 2003 season, Szymborski became commonly quoted in print and web media as an expert in the field of baseball statistics. Currently, he is a contributor for ESPN and is a senior writer for FanGraphs.

References
Time, "50 Best Websites", December 18, 2002.
Dan Szymborski, "Bonds Unlikely to Hit 35 Home Runs Next Year". Oakland Tribune, September 23, 2005.
Dan Szymborski, "Pujols faces long and winding road to 714", Oakland Tribune, May 26, 2006.
David Gassko, "Projection Roundtable", The Hardball Times, July 31, 2006.
Nate Silver, Information "2007 Hitter Projection Roundup", Baseball Prospectus, October 4, 2007.
Dan Rosenheck, "Toledo, Here He Comes?", The New York Times, November 25, 2007.
David Appelman, "Inside the 2007 player projection systems", CNN/SI, September 19, 2007
Geoff Baker, "Projecting Bedard's Mariners" , The Seattle Times, February 5, 2008.
St. Petersburg Times, "What they're saying about the Rays", March 30, 2008.
Vlae Kershner, "Computer unkind to Crosby", SFGate, October 24, 2008.
Jerry Crasnick, "Young core gives Reds immediate hope", ESPN.com, April 2, 2009.

1978 births
Living people
Writers from Baltimore
Baseball statisticians
Baseball culture